The beardfishes consist of a single extant genus, Polymixia, of deep-sea marine ray-finned fish named for their pair of long hyoid barbels. They are classified in their own order Polymixiiformes . But as Nelson says, "few groups have been shifted back and forth as frequently as this one, and they were recently added to Paracanthoptergii". For instance, they have previously been classified as belonging to the Beryciformes.  They are of little economic importance.

They are found in tropical and subtropical waters of the Atlantic, Indian and western Pacific Ocean. They are bottom-dwelling fish, found down to about  depth.

Classification
 Order Polymixiiformes Rosen & Patterson, 1969
 Genus †Cumbaaichthys Murray 2016
 †Cumbaaichthys oxyrhynchus Murray 2016
 Family †Boreiohydriidae Murray & Cumbaa 2013
 Genus †Boreiohydrias Murray & Cumbaa 2013
 †Boreiohydrias dayi Murray & Cumbaa 2013
 Family †Digoriidae Bannikov 1985
 Genus †Digoria Jordan 1923
 †Digoria ambigua Jordan 1923
 Family Polymixiidae Gill 1862 [Berycopsidae Regan 1911; Dalmatichthyidae Radovčić 1975; Omosomopsidae Gaudant 1978; Homonotichthyidae Whitley 1933]
 Genus †Apricenaichthys Taverne 2011
 †Apricenaichthys italicus 
 Genus †Berycopsia Radovčić 1975
 †Berycopsia inopinnata Radovčić 1975
 Genus †Berycopsis Dixon 1850 [Platycormus von der Marck 1900]
 †B. elegans Dixon 1850 [Platycormus elegans (Dixon 1850)]
 †B. germana (Agassiz 1839) [Beryx germanus Agassiz 1839; Platycormus germanus (Agassiz 1839)]
 †B. pulcher Bannikov & Bacchia 2004
 Genus †Dalmatichthys Radovčić 1975
 †Dalmatichthys malezi Radovčić 1975
 Genus †Homonotichthys Whitley 1933
 †H. dorsalis (Dixon 1850) [Homonotus dorsalis Dixon 1850]
 †H. elegans (Dixon 1850) [Homonotus elegans Dixon 1850]
 †H. rotundus (Woodward 1902) [Homonotus rotundus Woodward 1902]
 Genus †Magrebichthys Murray & Wilson 2014
 †Magrebichthys nelsoni Murray & Wilson 2014
 Genus †Omosoma Costa 1857
 †O. garretti Bardack 1976
 †O. pulchellum Davis 1887
 †O. sahelaimae Costa 1857
 †O. tselfatense Gaudant 1978
 Genus †Omosomopsis Gaudant 1978
 †Omosomopsis sima (Arambourg 1954) Gaudant 1978
 Genus †Parapolymyxia David 1946
 Genus †Pycnosterinx Heckel 1849 [Imogaster Costa 1857] 
 †P. discoides Heckel 1849
 †P. dorsalis Pictet 1850
 †P. heckelii Pictet 1850
 †P. latus Davis 1887
 †P. russeggeri Heckel 1849 [Homonotus pulcher Davis 1886]
 Genus Polymixia Lowe 1836 [Dinemus Poey 1860; Nemobrama Valenciennes 1860 non Jordan, Evermann & Clark 1930] 
 P. berndti Gilbert 1905 (Pacific beardfish)
 P. busakhini Kotlyar 1993 (Busakhin's beardfish)
 P. fusca Kotthaus 1970
 P. japonica Günther 1877 (Silver eye)
 P. longispina Deng, Xiong & Zhan 1983 [Polymixia kawadae Okamura & Ema 1985]
 P. lowei Günther 1859 (Beardfish)
 P. nobilis Lowe 1838 [Nemobrama webbii Valenciennes 1837; Dinemus venustus Poey 1860; Polymixia nobilis virginica Nichols & Firth 1936] (Stout beardfish)
 †P. polita Schwarzhans 2012
 P. salagomeziensis Kotlyar 1991
 P. sazonovi Kotlyar 1992
 P. yuri Kotlyar 1982

Timeline of genera

References

 

 
Fish of Hawaii
Extant Late Cretaceous first appearances